The Adriatic Review was a monthly periodical published in Boston by Vatra from September 1918 until October 1919.
In September 1918, Fan Noli founded the English-language monthly Adriatic Review which was financed by the Pan-Albanian federation to spread information about Albania and its cause.

Noli edited the journal for the first six months, and was succeeded in 1919 by Constantin Anastas Chekrezi.

See also
Vatra, the Pan-Albanian Federation of America
Zëri i Popullit (1912)
Fan Noli
Constantin Anastas Chekrezi

References

External links
The Adriatic Review

Monthly magazines published in the United States
Defunct magazines published in the United States
Magazines established in 1918
Magazines disestablished in 1919
Magazines published in Boston